Saawan is a 2017 Pakistani suspense drama film directed by Farhan Alam and produced and written by Mashood Qadri under the production banner of Kalakar Films. The film is based on a true story of a disabled child, who faced difficulties in the deserts of Pakistan. The film stars Saleem Mairaj, Syed Karam Abbas, Arif Bahalim, Najiba Faiz and Imran Aslam in the lead roles. The other cast includes Tipu Sharif, Hafeez Ali, Sehrish Qadri, Sohail Malik, Shahid Niazmi, Muhammad Abbas, Danial Yunus, Mehek Zulfiqar and Syed Muhammad Ali. A special appearance is made by Lt. Gen. S. A. A. Najmi (R). It was selected as the Pakistani entry for the Best Foreign Language Film at the 90th Academy Awards, but it was not nominated.

Plot
The film tells the story of a disabled child, who is up against all kinds of obstacles and cruelty.

Cast
 Saleem Mairaj
Syed Karam Abbas
Arif Bahalim
Najiba Faiz
 Imran Aslam
 Tipu Sharif
Hafeez Ali
Sehrish Qadri
Sohail Malik
Shahid Niazmi]]
Muhammad Abbas
Danial Yunus
Mehek Zulfiqar
Syed Muhammad Ali
 Lt. Gen. S. A. A. Najmi (R)
 Liam (dog)

Production
The official trailer of the film was released in early March 2016. The film was shot in the Balochistan and Northern region of Pakistan in Quetta district, Ziarat district, Gilgit-Baltistan and Shigar.

Release
The film is scheduled for release in 2017 in Pakistan as well as United Arab Emirates, United States, United Kingdom and India under the production banner of Kalakar Films. Rehmat K Fazli, the head of Geo Films in an Interview confirmed that film will release in late September 2017.

Home media 
Saawan was made available for streaming on Netflix.

Awards
The film won 'Best Foreign Language Feature Film' award at the Madrid International Film Festival 2017, Saawan has also been selected at the Social World Film Festival, Italy, where it is nominated for Best Film, Best Director and special prize of the critics award.

The film won 'Best Film' and 'Best Director' with Farhan Alam at the Social World Film Festival 2017 in Naples,Italy.

The film won "Best Film' and 'Best Musical Score' at the Salento International Film Festival 2017

See also
 List of Pakistani films of 2017
 List of submissions to the 90th Academy Awards for Best Foreign Language Film
 List of Pakistani submissions for the Academy Award for Best Foreign Language Film

References

External links

2017 films
Pakistani drama films
Films shot in Gilgit-Baltistan
2010s Urdu-language films
2017 drama films